Jess Gardiner (born 1993) is an Australian off-road motorcycle racer competing in Enduro and Endurocross competitions.

Gardiner began her motorcycle racing career competing in motocross before transitioning to Enduro competitions. In 2013, Gardiner became the first Australian woman to win the International Six Days Enduro (Women's class). She's a 5-time champion of the Australian_Off_Road_Championship in the Women's class. She's sponsored by Yamaha, MXstore, Ballards Offroad. She's in a relationship with French rider and teammate, Jeremy Carpentier. Her "day job" is a heavy equipment operator with JK Williams Contracting Pty Ltd in Penrith, NSW, Australia.

Results

Social media 

 https://www.instagram.com/missjessgardiner/
 https://web.facebook.com/Missjessgardiner
 https://twitter.com/jessgardiner737

References 

1993 births
Living people
Female motorcycle racers
Off-road motorcycle racers
Australian motorcycle racers
Enduro riders